Launois-sur-Vence is a commune in the Ardennes department in northern France.

Population

Notable people 
 Jules Mary (1851-1922) was a French novelist

See also
 Communes of the Ardennes department

References

Communes of Ardennes (department)
Ardennes communes articles needing translation from French Wikipedia